Abdelhamid Sellal is an Algerian former football player and manager who managed the national team.

References

Year of birth missing (living people)
Living people
Algerian footballers
Algerian football managers
Algeria national football team managers
Association footballers not categorized by position
21st-century Algerian people